Untermarchtal is a municipality in the district of Alb-Donau in Baden-Württemberg in Germany.

References

Towns in Baden-Württemberg
Alb-Donau-Kreis
Württemberg